Escobaria missouriensis, the Missouri foxtail cactus and formerly Coryphantha missouriensis, is a species of low-growing North American cacti. It is found in along the Missouri River in the tallgrass prairie and shortgrass Great Plains, from Texas to Montana and the Dakotas, and in the Rocky Mountains woodlands of Ponderosa pine (Pinus ponderosa), pinyon-juniper, and Gambel oak (Quercus gambelii) west of it. It is also native to the Southwestern United States in Arizona, New Mexico, and Utah.

Description
They are generally larger in the Southwest. The plants are primarily unbranched, except eastern populations that can be profusely branched. The spines are bright white, pale gray, or pale tan, weathering to gray or yellowish brown. The plant blooms in April to June, with flowers that are pale greenish yellow to yellow-green with midstripes of green or rose-pink to pale brown.

Escobaria missouriensis has been extirpated from many of its historically known sites by introduced fire ants, suburban development, brush encroachment following fire suppression, and over-grazing.

Subspecies
Escobaria missouriensis subsp. asperispina (Boed.) N.P.Taylor 
Escobaria missouriensis subsp. missouriensis

References

External links

Flora of North America — Coryphantha missouriensis (Escobaria missouriensis)
United States Department of Agriculture Plants Profile: Escobaria missouriensis
Lady Bird Johnson Wildflower Center, University of Texas: Escobaria missouriensis (Missouri foxtail cactus)

missouriensis
Cacti of the United States
Plants described in 1826
Flora of the United States